Players and pairs who neither have high enough rankings nor receive wild cards may participate in a qualifying tournament held one week before the annual Wimbledon Tennis Championships.

Seeds

  Lukáš Dlouhý /  David Škoch (qualifying competition, lucky losers)
  Huntley Montgomery /  Tripp Phillips (first round)
  Robert Lindstedt /  Alexander Peya (qualified)
  James Blake /  Mark Merklein (qualifying competition)
  Stephen Huss /  Wesley Moodie (qualified)
  Łukasz Kubot /  Jason Marshall (first round)
  Brandon Coupe /  Rik de Voest (first round)
 n/a

Qualifiers

  Tuomas Ketola /  Frédéric Niemeyer
  Ramón Delgado /  André Sá
  Robert Lindstedt /  Alexander Peya
  Stephen Huss /  Wesley Moodie

Lucky losers

  Lukáš Dlouhý /  David Škoch
  Ross Hutchins /  Martin Lee

Qualifying draw

First qualifier

Second qualifier

Third qualifier

Fourth qualifier

External links

2005 Wimbledon Championships – Men's draws and results at the International Tennis Federation

Men's Doubles Qualifying
Wimbledon Championship by year – Men's doubles qualifying